The Institution of Analysts and Programmers is a professional body that represents those working in Systems Analysis, Design, Programming and implementation of computer systems both in the United Kingdom and internationally. Established in 1972 it has supported system developers across the world.

Overview 
With a worldwide membership, the IAP is a private company limited by guarantee and a registered charity in England and Wales. Its objectives are to promote the ethical development of computer systems and applications. In addition,  it promotes the learning of systems development to all ages.

The IAP has its head office in Hanwell, London and its Administration Centre in Worthing.

Members have access to a wide range of information and can download the ''Software Development Practice online magazine on a regular basis.

Timeline

 1972: Founded as the University Computer Association
 1981: Name Changed to The Institution of Analysts and Programmers
 1981: The late Bob Charles appointed as Secretary General
 1990: Mike Ryan appointed Director General
 1992: Institution Incorporated
 1994: Granted Coat of Arms
 2010: Alastair Revell appointed as Director General
 2011: Transformation Programme Started
 2017: Adopted a new constitution
 2018: The Institution became a charity in England and Wales (Charity Number 1179558)
 2021: Founding Member of the UK Cyber Security Council
 2022: Celebrated 50th Anniversary

Governance
The IAP is governed by a Trustee Board, which comprises:-

(a) up to six Elected Trustees elected at a general meeting by the membership;
(b) up to three Lay Trustees appointed from outside of the membership of the Institution by the Trustee Board;
(c) an appointed Trustee to act as Treasurer as an Ex Officio Trustee;
(d) the Director General as an Ex Officio Trustee (unless remunerated);
(e) the Chair of the council as an Ex Officio Trustee;
(f) the vice-chair of the council as an Ex Officio Trustee.

The Trustee Board elects the President and vice-president from the Elected Trustees.

The day-to-day operation of the Institution is delegated to the Director General, who appoints the executive board, which includes an Operations Director and a Director for Membership Engagement.

Membership
The IAP has the following grades of membership:-

 Licentiate (LIAP)
 Graduate Member (GradIAP)
 Associate Member (AMIAP)
 Member (MIAP)
 Fellow (FIAP)
 Distinguished Fellow (DFIAP)

It also has two grades that do not carry post-nominal letters: Registrant and Affiliate.

Work  

The Institution has been extensively involved in the formation of the UK Cyber Security Council, becoming a founding member of the Cyber Security Alliance in 2016, which successfully bid to form the Council for HM Government. The project was led by the IET, a fellow alliance partner.

In 2021. the Institution supported the inaugural Cyber OSPAs fielding Alastair Revell (its Director General) as a judge.

Communities of Practice
The Institution has recently established a Community of Practice around cyber security (Cyber COP), bringing together a number of leading software developers with experience in writing secure code.

Academic Prizes Programme
The Academic Prizes Programme is a venture with some universities where the IAP awards prizes to students for their software projects. The awards are given for excellence in design and development. John Thompson was an early recipient of this scheme at the University of Plymouth.

Subsidiary
The Institution is the parent body of the Trustworthy Software Foundation, the successor body to the Trustworthy Software Initiative (TSI)  established under the UK National Cyber Security Programme I to promote good software development practices.

See also
Trustworthy Software Foundation

References

External links
 IAP Website
 Software Development Practice website
 Trustworthy Software Foundation

Professional associations based in the United Kingdom
Information technology organisations based in the United Kingdom
Information technology charities